Sharifabad, Ardakan (Persian: شریف آباد‎, also romanized as Sharfava) is a township in the Central District of Ardakan County, Yazd Province, Iran. It is located near the county capital, Ardakan, and had a population of 4,000 as of the 2006 census. Sharifabad is one of the Zoroastrian centres of Iran, home to numerous Zoroastrian holy sites. Every summer, thousands of Zoroastrians from around the world gather here on pilgrimage. Sharifabad is also notable for the 1,000-year-old Qutbabad aqueduct that runs through the village. The village is home to both Muslims and Zoroastrians who worship separately and respect each other's beliefs.

Sharifabad is present in the historical book of Rostam Biliwani, which recorded that the village was formerly called "Shahriabad" and later renamed "Sharafabad" before receiving its current name.

Zoroastrianism and Sharifabad 
In Zoroastrianism's long history, Sharifabad has been of substantial importance as "the most important center for preserving traditional Zoroastrian beliefs in Iran, and the residence of many great priests for centuries."  This led English writer Mary Boyce to describe the village as "A Persian Stronghold of Zoroastrianism". Her research on the life of Zoroastrian Sharifabad residents has been useful in research into contemporary Zoroastrian beliefs.

Hiromba
A festival of fire called Hiromba, (translation: "making bonfires", also known as Sadeh), is celebrated in Sharifabad.

Zoroastrian relations with Mumbai
To review the rules and regulations of the Zoroastrians of India (Parsis), the people of Sharifabad sought help from their counterparts in Iran. Behnam Nariman Houshang arrived with questions about the rules of the Zoroastrian religion, which were used to test the priests of Sharifabad and Torkabad villages. This was the first interaction between the Zoroastrians of Yazd and the Parsis. These relations have continued for 300 years. The trading relationship between the East India Company and the Parsis also encouraged the Sharifabad Zoroastrians (and other Zoroastrian villages of Yazd) to emigrate to Iran. Mankeji Limji Houshangpour Hatria (whose ancestors were Iranian immigrants to India during the Safavid era) traveled to Iran and helped improve the Zoroastrians' lives in Yazd.

Architecture
Parsi immigrants built small Zoroastrian schools in the early 19th century. Zoroastrian shrines, millennial aqueducts, brick and mud houses, narrow alleys, and large water reservoirs are found in the village. Sharifabad is also home to a famous Zoroastrian fire temple.

Economy

The economy of Sharifabad historically revolved around agriculture, with residents farming the deserts of Esmatabad and Allahabad. However, with the decline of the aqueduct and reduced groundwater, many have gradually turned to industrial production and service jobs. A considerable portion of the Muslim population has transitioned to craftsmanship, contributing to the tile, ceramic, and glass industries of the Yazd province. A growing number of residents have immigrated to Canada and the United States.

See also 
 Yazd Atash Behram
 Iranshah Atash Behram, another notable Zoroastrian pilgrimage site in India.

References 

 Populated places in Yazd Province
 Zoroastrianism